HDMS Flyvefisken (P550) is a Danish warship. She is the name ship in the Flyvefisken class, which is also known as the Standardflex 300 or SF300 class. In 2007, Flyvefisken was sold to the Lithuanian Navy, which renamed her LKL Zemaitis.

External links
 http://www.naval-technology.com/projects/fly/

References

Flyvefisken-class patrol vessels
Ships built in Denmark
1986 ships
Flyvefisken-class patrol vessels of the Lithuanian Naval Force
Patrol vessels of Lithuania